Akyünlü is a village in the Mazgirt District, Tunceli Province, Turkey. The village is populated by Kurds of the Kurêşan tribe and had a population of 27 in 2021.

The hamlets of Arpabük and Beydamı are attached to the village.

References 

Villages in Mazgirt District
Kurdish settlements in Tunceli Province